The Government Seal of Japan, one of the country's national seals, is the emblem (mon) of paulownia used by the Prime Minister, the Cabinet and the Government of Japan on official documents. It resembles a stylized paulownia with 5-7-5 flowers.

History 

Before the Chrysanthemum Seal was used extensively, the Paulownia Seal originally was the private symbol of the Japanese Imperial Family, from as early as the sixteenth century. The Toyotomi clan, led by Toyotomi Hideyoshi, later adopted the Paulownia Seal for use as the crest of his clan. After the Meiji Restoration, the seal was eventually adopted as the emblem of the Japanese government.

It is now mainly used by the Japanese government, as a contrast to the Chrysanthemum Seal which represents the Emperor as the symbol of the sovereignty of the State, and members of the Imperial Family.

Designs

More than 140 designs exist. It is found in the emblems of the Ministry of Justice and the Imperial Guard Headquarters. The 5-7 Paulownia and 5-3 Paulownia are also called "Go-shichi Giri" and "Go-san Giri" without the particle "no" respectively, due to consonant mutation ("Kiri" → "Giri") known as rendaku in the Japanese language. The Paulownia Seals contain the leaves and flowers of Paulownia tomentosa ("princess tree"), which is called "kiri" (桐) or "shirogiri (白桐)" in Japanese. 
{| class="wikitable"
|+
!Design
!Image
!Name
!Japanese
!Description
|-
| rowspan="2" |5-3 Paulownia
|
|"Maru ni Go-san no Kiri"
|丸に五三桐
|-
|
|"Go-san Oni Kiri"
|五三鬼桐
|The 5-3 Paulownia flowers of this design resemble oni'''s sharp horns. 
|-
| rowspan="2" |5-7 Paulownia
|
|"Go-shichi no Kiri"
|五七桐
|The plain 5-7 Paulownia has been used by those in power and is the official emblem of the Prime Minister, the Cabinet, and the Government today. It resembles a stylized paulownia with 5-7-5 flowers.
|-
|
|"Taikō Kiri"
|太閤桐
|Toyotomi Hideyoshi used the 5-3 Paulownia and 5-7 Paulownia crests, and this was one of his official mon. A retired kampaku was called taikō, which commonly referred to him.
|-
| rowspan="2" |Other
|
|nihongo|"Tosa Kiri"
|土佐桐
|The Tosa Yamauchi clan used this variant, which came from the crest that Yamauchi Kazutoyo received from Toyotomi Hideyoshi.
|-
|
|"Kiri Agehachō"
|桐揚羽蝶
|This design shows a swallowtail butterfly mimicking paulownia.
|}

 See also 
 Mon (emblem)
 National seals of Japan
 Order of the Paulownia Flowers
 Sanmon Gosan no Kiri University of Tsukuba

References

External links
 Kamon Database by KamonDB: Kirimon 
 Kamon Database by Studio Hata: Kirimon 
 Japan Crest free material hakkodaiodo—Japan Kamon'' Image material 

National symbols of Japan
Japan
Japanese coats of arms
Japanese heraldry